Aii Language Center (Aii) is a North American Standard based center specializing in languages and is one of the biggest English language centers in Cambodia. Aii offers various programs, including English, Diploma Course, Chinese and Thai language training programs, Test of English as a Foreign Language (TOEFL) preparation course, TESOL House and i-Learn English. It operates in six campuses in Phnom Penh, one campus in Siem Reap and one campus in Takeo, Cambodia.

History 
Aii Language Center (Aii) is a subsidiary of the Mengly J. Quach Education and a sister company of American Intercon School. It was founded by Mengly Jandy Quach in Phnom Penh in 2005. It started with only 20 students in 2005 and by 2022, Aii has over 9,000 students studying in 6 campuses  in Phnom Penh, one campus in Siem Reap and one campus in Takeo and over 50,000 alumni.

Aii Language Center requires staff and teachers to have a professional persona with high morality in order to provide education for all their students. Students are also instilled with a sense of respect, morality and dignity.

During Covid-19 period
Since the pandemic began, most schools did not have enough tuition fees to cover paying wages, rents, utilities and interest on loans and they would have to suspend their operations. Rental fees were the biggest issue, and while there were some supports from the government and financial institutions, these simply were not enough. As an educational institution, funding requires more than just solely the tuition fee. It also relied on the school bus, food, uniforms, books and other administration fees to support the business model.

Like other private schools, Aii was struggling with financial hardship during Covid-19 period. In a meeting of Cambodian Higher Education Association, Mengly J. Quach stated that he tried to negotiate with the building owner, while other school owners have also attempted similar negotiations without any success. Thus, numerous private schools in Cambodia were expected to go bankrupt since many of them took loans to open their schools.

During the COVID-19 pandemic which hit hard on Cambodia and its education sector, Aii continued its distant teaching activities. It plans to expand its campus to Siem Reap which will be its first provincial campus.

School life
Aii offers a holistic approach in learning a second language with the integration of 21st Century skills, the Common European Framework of References, and various activities offered to students. Students engage in fun-filled learning activities and learn from innovative series of textbooks and supporting resources. Aii Language Center teaches the importance of sportsmanship and challenges students to strive for the best through the Mengly J. Quach Spelling Bee Contest, the Mengly J. Quach Pronunciation Contest, the Mengly J. Quach WordSpeed Contest, Sports & Athletics Competitions, Field Trips, Oversea Trips and Activities. One of the most successful activities is "Talents for a Cause", where students of Aii Language Center and American Intercon School put on a special talent show and the proceeds from ticket sales go directly to the MJQ Foundation.

Campuses 
Aii Language Center is operating six campuses in six different areas of the Phnom Penh while one more campus will be opened in Siem Reap:
 Mao Tse Tong Campus (Main Office), located along Mao Tse Tong Blvd, Sangkat Tumnup Teuk, Khan Boeung Keng Kang. - 2005
 Toul Kork Campus, located on Street 289, Sangkat Boeung Kak I, Khan Toul Kork (in front of Toul Kork Primary School). - 2014
 Chak Angre Campus, located at Building 824, National Road 2, Sangkat Chak Angre Krom, Khan Meanchey (Opposite Preah Noray Roundabout, Takhmao City or Kandal Branch). – 2015
 Choam Chao Campus, Building No. 222, Veng Sreng Street, Chrey Kong Village, Sangkat Choam Chao 2, Khan Por Senchey, Phnom Penh. – 2019
 Phsar Thmey Campus, Phnom Penh, Building No. 1C and 13D, Street 53, Corner of 154, Sangkat Phsar Thmey 3, Khan Daun Penh, Phnom Penh. - 2019
 Chroy Chongva Campus, Building No. 158JKLM, National Road No. 6A, Sangkat Chroy Chongva, Khan Chroy Chongva, Phnom Penh. - 2019
 Siem Reap Campus, National Road No. 6, Sala Kanseng Village, Svay Dangkum District, Siem Reap City, Siem Reap Province. - 2022 
 Takeo Branch, National Road No 2, Daun Keo City, Takeo Province

References

External links 
 Aii Language Center

Schools in Phnom Penh